Strange Confession is a 1945 Inner Sanctum film noir mystery horror film, released by Universal Pictures and starring Lon Chaney Jr., J. Carrol Naish and Brenda Joyce. The film was directed by John Hoffman and was later rereleased under the title The Missing Head.  The "Inner Sanctum" franchise originated with a popular radio series.

Plot
Jeff Carter (Lon Chaney, Jr.) is testing a vaccine for influenza. He is working for tycoon, Roger Graham (J. Carrol Naish), who takes the credit and the profit for Jeff's discovery. Roger cares more about profits than safety. Jeff resigns and is blacklisted by his boss.

Jeff heads to South America to perfect the formula. Graham has used this opportunity to release the drug and romance Jeff's attractive wife, Mary (Brenda Joyce). When Jeff hears that his son has died, he takes revenge.

Cast

 Lon Chaney, Jr. as Jeff Carter
 Brenda Joyce as Mary Carter
 J. Carrol Naish as Roger Graham
 Milburn Stone as Stevens
 Lloyd Bridges as Dave Curtis
 Addison Richards as Dr. Williams
 Mary Gordon as Mrs. O'Connor
 George Chandler as Harper
 Wilton Graff as Brandon
 Francis McDonald as José Hernandez
 Jack Norton as Jack
 Christian Rub as Mr. Moore
 Wheaton Chambers as Mr. Reed
 William Desmond as Peanut Vendor
 Jack Perrin as Cop
 Beatrice Roberts as Miss Rogers
 Ian Wolfe as Frederick

Critical reception
Describing the film in TV Guide as "One of the stronger entries in Universal's Inner Sanctum series," critic Craig Butler wrote that it was "tidily entertaining" and "a solidly entertaining way to kill an hour." Writing in DVD Talk, critic David Cornelius described the film as "twenty minutes of pretty good movie mixed with ten minutes of a pretty good movie of an entirely other kind, then spread across thirty more minutes of drabness." Reviewer David Kalat wrote for Turner Classic Movies that unlike most B-movies, the film "tried to dramatize the problems of pharmaceutical companies rushing untested drugs to market - fewer still have dialogue like, 'He had my brain in his head and I had to get my brain back.'"

References

External links 

 
 
 
Review of film at Variety

1945 films
American mystery horror films
American black-and-white films
Films based on radio series
Universal Pictures films
1945 mystery films
1945 horror films
Film noir
Medical-themed films
American films about revenge
Films directed by John Hoffman
1940s American films